Cuijk is a former municipality in upper southeastern Netherlands. Cuijk, Boxmeer, Grave, Mill en Sint Hubert, and Sint Anthonis merged into the new municipality of Land van Cuijk on 1 January 2022. 

The former municipality of Cuijk was established by combining the municipalities of Cuijk en Sint Agatha, Beers and Haps in 1994.

Population centres 
The main population center Cuijk is of pre-historic origin. Its existence is recorded on the Roman roadmap Tabula Peutingeriana under the name of Ceuclum. It is a big commuter town with good public transport services to nearby Nijmegen. The nearest hospital is at Boxmeer and the nearest international airport is situated in the German town of Weeze. Cuijk has a railway station on the Nijmegen to Venlo railway.

Population centers and inhabitants in 2020:

 Cuijk 18,170 
 Beers 1,680 
 Haps 2,850 
 Katwijk 395
 Linden 270
 Sint Agatha 495
 Vianen 1,280

Topography

Map of the former municipality of Cuijk, 2015

Transportation
Cuijk railway station

Twin towns 
Cuijk was twinned with

Notable people 
 Jan de Quay (1901 – 1985 in Beers) a Dutch politician and psychologist, Prime Minister of the Netherlands 1959/1963
 Pieter Bogaers (1924 in Cuijk – 2008) a Dutch politician
 Jordie van der Laan (born 1993 in Cuijk) a Dutch football player

Gallery

References

External links 

 

Former municipalities of North Brabant
Municipalities of the Netherlands established in 1994
Municipalities of the Netherlands disestablished in 2022